Zero Set is the only album by the German electronic music trio of Dieter Moebius, Conny Plank, and Mani Neumeier.  It followed two collaborations by Moebius & Plank as a duo.  Zero Set was recorded in September, 1982 at Conny's Studio outside Cologne, and released by Sky Records in 1983. The track "Recall" features Sudanese vocals by Deuka. 

Zero Set was reissued by the Gyroscope label on CD on April 16, 1996.  This was the first U.S. release for the album. It was also digitally remastered and reissued by Captain Trip Records in Japan on February 25, 2007.

Reception
Matthew Weiner describes it for Soulmind Online: "Though not a dance record per se, Zero Set is one of the earliest extensions of Krautrock’s possibilities on the dance floor, pitting the profoundly electronic sequence patterns of Plank and Moebius against the hyperactive percussives of Guru Guru drummer Mani Neumeier. On tracks such as the prophetically titled 'Speed Display' and 'Pitch Control', the phasing, chattering and decidedly Germanic grooves found on Zero Set constitute vibrant proto-techno at its earliest and finest."  David Ross Smith, writing for Allmusic, describes the album: "...a highly percussive affair with Mani Neumeier. The album is saturated in drum and synth rhythms and polyrhythms, resulting in compositions that are energetic and infectious."  Zero Set was a turning point for Moebius and Plank, a fact lamented by Steven and Alan Freeman in their book The Crack In The Cosmic Egg. They say, in part: "...working with Mani Neumeier on Zero Set strangely took the music too close to techno for comfort..."

In 2007 Dieter Moebius and Mani Neumeier recorded Zero Set II in Japan as a tribute to Conny Plank.

Track listing
"Speed Display" (5:13)
"Load" (5:20)
"Pitch Control" (6:23)
"All Repro" (3:28)
"Recall" (8:34)
"Search Zero" (8:38)

Personnel
Dieter Moebius – synthesizers, keyboards
Conny Plank – production
Mani Neumeier – drums
Deuka – vocals on "Recall"

References 

 Album liner notes
 Smith, David Ross [ Allmusic Review]  Retrieved September 19, 2007.
 Weiner, Matthew The Producers  Retrieved September 19, 2007.
 Freeman, Steven and Freeman, Alan The Crack In The Cosmic Egg (Audion Publications, 1996)   Retrieved September 7, 2007.
 Discogs Moebius Plank Neumeier - Zero Set  Retrieved September 12, 2007.
 Captain Trip Records  Cluster Digital Remasters  Retrieved September 12, 2007.

External links
 Anonymous Random Writings on Music and Other Things: German Rock  Retrieved September 7, 2007.

1983 albums
Sky Records albums
Moebius & Plank albums
Albums produced by Conny Plank